Natalia Gatti  (born 20 October 1982) is an Argentine women's international footballer who plays as a forward. She is a member of the Argentina women's national football team. She was part of the team at the 2003 FIFA Women's World Cup and 2007 FIFA Women's World Cup. On club level she played for Boca Juniors in Argentina, and currently she's playing for KAC (Kimberley Athletic Club).

References

1982 births
Living people
Place of birth missing (living people)
Argentine women's footballers
Women's association football forwards
Argentina women's international footballers
2003 FIFA Women's World Cup players
Footballers at the 2007 Pan American Games
Pan American Games competitors for Argentina
2007 FIFA Women's World Cup players